The Mongolia women's national volleyball team represents Mongolia in international women's volleyball competitions and friendly matches.

It qualified for the Asian Women's Volleyball Championship twice. (2013 and 2015)

It won the bronze medal at the 2018 East Asian Volleyball Championship.

Eastern Asian Women's Volleyball Championship

2010 Eastern Asian Women's Volleyball Championship
  Eastern Asian Women's Volleyball Championship 2010 — To be determined
  Eastern Asian Women's Volleyball Championship 2016 — To be determined
  Eastern Asian Women's Volleyball Championship 2018 — To be determined

2010 Fixtures and Results

2016 Eastern Asian Women's Volleyball Championship
Dates: 19–24 July
Host Countries:  China

2016 Fixtures and Results

5th–8th places

2018 Eastern Asian Women's Volleyball Championship
Dates: 10–15 July
Host Countries:  China

2018 Fixtures and Results

5th–8th places

References

External links
Mongolia Volleyball Federation

National women's volleyball teams
Volleyball
Volleyball in Mongolia
Women's sport in Mongolia